Changbaishan Airport  is an airport serving the city of Baishan and the tourist destination of Changbai Mountain (Mount Baekdu) in Jilin Province, China. It was opened on August 3, 2008.

Airlines and destinations

See also
List of airports in China
List of the busiest airports in China

References

Airports in Jilin
Baishan
Airports established in 2008
2008 establishments in China